Bird v Bicknell [1987] 2 NZLR 542 is a cited case in New Zealand regarding fraud merely being a factor (albeit an important factor) in determining whether an exclusion clause is valid or not. It is contrasted  with M E Torbett Ltd v Keirlor Motels Ltd where is held that an exclusion clause is simply not valid where a party has committed fraud.

Background
Bird was in the business of selling franchises regarding a chemical process, which they told Bicknell was secret only to them, and that a patent application was pending. These claims were later discovered to be fraudulent, and Bicknell refused to make the final payment on his franchise. Bird pointed out the contract had a clause agreeing to no warranties were given about the patent.

Bird sued Bicknell.

Held
The court found that the exclusion clause was not "fair and reasonable".

References

Court of Appeal of New Zealand cases
New Zealand contract case law
1987 in New Zealand law
1987 in case law